Asman is the Avestan and Middle Persian name of the Zoroastrian divinity that is the hypostasis of the sky. The 27th day of the Zoroastrian calendar is dedicated to him. In the Veda,  means 'sky'. It also means "stone" so the specific sense in reference to the sky is as "stony firmament".

In the Avesta, specifically in the Vendidad, the word is mentioned as being the first thing created. The word is also the origination of the word  in modern Persian and numerous languages of South Asia.

References

Bibliography

Further reading
 Bläsing, Uwe. ""Asme, Asmen, Astare": Nordwestiranisches Wortgut Im Türkeitürkischen." Iran & the Caucasus 1 (1997): 171–78. www.jstor.org/stable/4030750.

Yazatas